The War of the Austrian Succession was a European conflict that took place between 1740 and 1748. Fought primarily in Central Europe, the Austrian Netherlands, Italy, the Atlantic and Mediterranean, related conflicts included King George's War in North America, the War of Jenkins' Ear, the First Carnatic War and the First and Second Silesian Wars. 

Its pretext was the right of Maria Theresa to succeed her father Emperor Charles VI as ruler of the Habsburg monarchy. France, Prussia and Bavaria saw it as an opportunity to challenge Habsburg power, while Maria Theresa was backed by Britain, the Dutch Republic and Hanover, collectively known as the Pragmatic Allies. As the conflict widened, it drew in other participants, among them Spain, Sardinia, Saxony, Sweden and Russia.

Prussia occupied Silesia in 1740 and repulsed Austrian efforts to regain it, although Austria and Sardinia defeated Spanish attempts to regain their territories in Northern Italy. By early 1748, France had conquered most of the Austrian Netherlands but a British naval blockade was crippling their trade and the state was close to bankruptcy. The stalemate led to the Treaty of Aix-la-Chapelle (1748) which confirmed Maria Theresa in her titles but failed to resolve underlying tensions between the signatories, many of whom were unhappy with the terms. France achieved minimal gains for vast expenditure, while the Spanish failed to recover Menorca or Gibraltar, ceded to Britain in 1713. 

The clearest winner was Prussia, which acquired Silesia from Austria, an outcome that undermined the long-standing Anglo-Austrian Alliance, since Maria Theresa deeply resented Britain's insistence she cede Silesia to make peace and whose main objective became regaining it. The war also demonstrated the vulnerability of Hanover, then held in personal union with the British Crown, while many British politicians felt they had received little benefit from the enormous subsidies paid to Austria. The result was the realignment known as the Diplomatic Revolution, in which Austria and France ended the French–Habsburg rivalry which had dominated European affairs for centuries, while Prussia allied with Great Britain. These changes set the scene for the outbreak of the Seven Years' War in 1756.

Background
The immediate cause of the war was the death in 1740 of Emperor Charles VI (1685–1740) and the inheritance of the Habsburg Monarchy, often collectively referred to as Austria. The 1703 Mutual Pact of Succession provided that if the Habsburgs became extinct in the male line, these possessions would go first to Maria Josepha and Maria Amalia, daughters of Emperor Joseph I, then those of Charles, his younger brother. Since Salic law excluded women from the inheritance, this agreement required approval by the various Habsburg territories and the Imperial Diet.

Charles succeeded Joseph in 1711 and two years later issued the Pragmatic Sanction of 1713, which confirmed the principle of female inheritance. However, it also modified the 1703 agreement by placing the rights of his own children first and after his first child Maria Theresa was born in 1717, Charles' internal and external policy was dominated by ensuring her succession ahead of his two nieces. Prior to their respective marriages to Frederick Augustus of Saxony and Charles Albert of Bavaria in 1719, both women were obliged to formally renounce their rights to the inheritance. Charles assumed the rivalry between Saxony and Bavaria would secure his daughter's throne, since neither would be prepared to allow the other to inherit, but instead he gave his two greatest rivals a legitimate claim to the Habsburg lands.

Charles was also seeking to ensure the succession of Maria Theresa not just to her family lands but the titles and powers of the Holy Roman Emperor. Although held by a Habsburg for over 300 years, it was theoretically an elective position which had never been held by a woman and this element turned an internal dynastic dispute into a European one. The problem was exacerbated by tensions within the Holy Roman Empire, caused by dramatic increases in the size and power of Bavaria, Prussia, and Saxony, mirrored by the post-1683 expansion of Habsburg power into lands previously held by the Ottoman Empire. These were the centrifugal forces behind a war that reshaped the traditional European balance of power; the various legal claims were largely pretexts and seen as such.

Bavaria and Saxony refused to be bound by the decision of the Imperial Diet, while in 1738 France agreed to back the 'just claims' of Charles Albert of Bavaria, despite previously accepting the Pragmatic Sanction in 1735. Attempts to offset this involved Austria in the 1733–1735 War of the Polish Succession and the Russo-Turkish War of 1735–1739, and it was weakened by the losses incurred. Compounded by the failure to prepare Maria Theresa for her new role, many European statesmen were sceptical Austria could survive the contest that would follow Charles' death, which finally occurred in October 1740.

Military overview and strategies
The war consisted of four primary theatres, Central Europe, Italy, the Austrian Netherlands and the seas, which can be divided into three separate but connected conflicts. The first involved Prussia and Austria in the Silesian Wars; in the second, Austria and Sardinia defeated Spanish attempts to regain territories in Northern Italy, while the third featured an increasingly global contest between Britain and France. In the end, French conquest of the Austrian Netherlands gave them clear dominance on land, while Britain's victories at sea cemented its place as the dominant naval power.

For much of the eighteenth century, French military strategy focused on potential threats on its eastern and northern borders, which required a strong land army. Its colonies were left to fend for themselves, or given minimal resources, anticipating they would likely be lost anyway. This strategy was driven by a combination of geography, and the superiority of the British navy, which made it difficult for the French navy to provide significant supplies and support to French colonies. The expectation was military victory in Europe would compensate for any colonial losses; in 1748, France recovered possessions like Louisbourg, in return for withdrawing from the Austrian Netherlands.

The British tried to avoid large-scale commitments of troops on the Continent. They sought to offset the disadvantage this created in Europe by allying themselves with one or more Continental powers whose interests were antithetical to those of their enemies, particularly France. In the War of the Austrian Succession, the British were allied with Austria; by the time of the Seven Years' War, they were allied with its enemy, Prussia. In contrast to France, once Britain became engaged in the war, it took advantage of the Royal Navy to expand it into the colonies. The British pursued a dual strategy of naval blockade and bombardment of enemy ports, and also utilized their ability to move troops by sea to the utmost. They would harass enemy shipping and attack enemy outposts, frequently using colonists from nearby British colonies in the effort. This plan worked better in North America than in Europe, but set the stage for the Seven Years' War.

Methods and technologies

European warfare in the early modern period was characterised by the widespread adoption of firearms in combination with more traditional bladed weapons. Eighteenth-century European armies were built around units of massed infantry armed with smoothbore flintlock muskets and bayonets. Cavalrymen were equipped with sabres and pistols or carbines; light cavalry were used principally for reconnaissance, screening and tactical communications, while heavy cavalry were used as tactical reserves and deployed for shock attacks. Smoothbore artillery provided fire support and played the leading role in siege warfare. Strategic warfare in this period centred around control of key fortifications positioned so as to command the surrounding regions and roads, with lengthy sieges a common feature of armed conflict. Decisive field battles were relatively rare, though they played a larger part in Frederick's theory of warfare than was typical among his contemporary rivals.

The War of the Austrian Succession, like most European wars of the eighteenth century, was fought as a so-called cabinet war in which disciplined regular armies were equipped and supplied by the state to conduct warfare on behalf of the sovereign's interests. Occupied enemy territories were regularly taxed and extorted for funds, but large-scale atrocities against civilian populations were rare compared with conflicts in the previous century. Military logistics was the decisive factor in many wars, as armies had grown too large to support themselves on prolonged campaigns by foraging and plunder alone. Military supplies were stored in centralised magazines and distributed by baggage trains that were highly vulnerable to enemy raids. Armies were generally unable to sustain combat operations during winter and normally established winter quarters in the cold season, resuming their campaigns with the return of spring.

Campaign of 1740

Frederick II succeeded his father Frederick William as king of Prussia on 31 May 1740 at the age of 28. Although Prussia had increased in importance over the past few decades, its disparate and scattered territories prevented it wielding significant power, a reality Frederick intended to change. The death of Emperor Charles VI on 20 October 1740 provided him with an ideal opportunity to acquire Silesia  but he needed to do so before Augustus of Saxony and Poland could pre-empt him.

With a population of 16 million, Austria had an authorised standing force of 157,000, although financial restraints meant its true size was considerably less than that in 1740. Since they had a much greater area to defend, their army was more of "a sieve" than a shield against foreign invasion. In contrast, the Prussian army was better trained and led than its opponents, while its standing army of 80,000 was disproportionately large, at around 4% of its 2.2 million population. To add to these advantages, in April 1739 Frederick ensured Austria faced war on two fronts when Louis XV of France agreed to attack from the west, while Prussia did so from the north. 

In early December 1740, the Prussian army assembled along the Oder river and on 16 December invaded Silesia without a formal declaration of war. Since Austrian military resources were concentrated in Hungary and Italy, they had fewer than 3,000 troops in Silesia, although this increased to 7,000 shortly before the invasion. They held onto the fortresses of Glogau, Breslau, and Brieg, but abandoned the rest of the province and withdrew into Moravia, with both sides taking up winter quarters. In under two weeks Prussia had occupied most of the richest province in the Holy Roman Empire, containing a population of over one million, the commercial centre of Wrocław along with mining, weaving and dyeing industries. However, Frederick underestimated Maria Theresa's determination to reverse her loss, while the retention of Austrian fortresses in Southern Silesia meant a quick victory could not be achieved.

Campaign of 1741

Early in the year, an Austrian army under von Neipperg relieved Neisse, and marched on Brieg, threatening to cut the Prussians off. On 10 April, just outside Brieg, they were defeated at the Battle of Mollwitz; Frederick made serious mistakes in his first battle, and was so close to defeat that his subordinates ordered him to avoid capture and leave the battlefield. His deputy von Schwerin managed to drag out a victory, both sides losing nearly 25% of their strength.

On 5 June, Frederick signed an alliance against Austria with France, who crossed the Rhine on 15 August.  A combined Franco-Bavarian force now advanced along the Danube, towards Vienna, capturing Linz on 14 September. Joined by a Saxon army of 20,000, they advanced on Prague from three different points, initially meeting little resistance. Before long, the Austrians had an army at Tábor, while Neipperg was recalled from Silesia to defend Vienna. Apparently close to defeat, on 21 September Maria Theresa made an emotional speech to the Hungarian Diet in Pressburg. They approved a levée en masse, which ultimately produced 22,000 troops, rather than the promised 60,000, but was an assertion of loyalty long remembered. 

Maria Theresa was also helped by deep divisions among her opponents and Frederick's duplicity. Hoping to weaken Saxony, on 9 October he signed the Klein–Schnellendorf agreement with Neipperg and in what is now considered a memorable act of diplomatic subterfuge, the Austrians surrendered Neisse after a mock defence. Under the prevailing rules of war, this allowed them to receive a pass to the nearest friendly territory and thus be used against Prussia's allies elsewhere, rather than being taken prisoner. Her best general, von Khevenhüller incorporated them into an army being assembled for a winter offensive to retake Upper Austria, and attack Bavaria.

While Frederick completed his conquest of Silesia, a French force under Maurice de Saxe took Prague on 26 November 1741, allowing the Bavarian elector, Charles Albert, to be crowned King of Bohemia. The year ended with Khevenhüller decisively defeating a bigger Franco-Bavarian army at Sankt Pölten and advancing up the Danube towards Linz, while a second column under Johann Bärenklau moved through the Tyrol, towards Munich.

Campaign of 1742
On 17 January, von Khevenhüller defeated a Bavarian army at Schärding while seven days later 10,000 French soldiers surrendered at Linz. On 12 February, Charles Albert of Bavaria was crowned Emperor Charles VII, the first non-Habsburg to hold the position in 300 years, although Bärenklau captured Munich the same day. Although technically all allies, Prussia, Saxony and Bavaria had no desire to see France established in the Empire, nor to see one another gain relative ground. Maria Theresa ended Austria's secret truce with Frederick, first releasing the details. The Austrians assembled a second army of 28,000 to retake Prague, under Charles of Lorraine.

News of the secret truce badly damaged the relationship between Frederick and his allies, but Emperor Charles asked him to relieve the pressure by invading Moravia. Frederick had used the interval to reorganise his cavalry, previously neglected in favour of the infantry, and who performed poorly at Mollwitz; they would prove more effective in the 1742 campaign.

In December 1741, von Schwerin had captured Olomouc; Frederick took Kłodzko, before moving onto Židlochovice in March 1742. This allowed him to threaten Vienna; a few Prussian patrols even appeared in the suburbs, before withdrawing. In early May, he took the offensive, and moved into North-East Bohemia; by 16 May, he had 10,000 infantry at Kutná Hora, and another 18,000 men under Leopold of Anhalt-Dessau a day's march behind.

On the afternoon of 16 May, Charles of Lorraine's cavalry ran into Leopold's rearguard. Leopold recognized he was in contact with the Austrian main force and so accelerated his march ahead to close the gap with Frederick. At 2:00 am on 17 May, his exhausted troops stopped at the small village of Chotusice, still three hours from Kutná Hora. Fought later the same day, the Battle of Chotusitz was inconclusive, but technically a Prussian victory, since the Austrians withdrew. On 24 May, French Field Marshal de Broglie won a minor action at Zahájí. The two victories left the strategic situation unchanged, since Charles was still able to move against Prague, while the Prussian presence in Moravia remained a threat to Vienna.

However, Habsburg policy was generally to avoid fighting on too many fronts at the same time; Prussia was the most dangerous, and most difficult to defeat. Although recovering Silesia remained a priority for decades, Maria Theresa was willing to agree a temporary truce with Prussia to improve her position elsewhere. This suited Frederick, who was short of money and men and also suspected France was preparing a separate peace. In June, the Treaty of Breslau ended the First Silesian War; Prussian troops withdrew from Bohemia, and Austria recaptured Prague in December.

Campaign of 1743

At the beginning of the year, Louis XV insisted Broglie be given command of the Franco-Bavarian forces, creating tension with the Bavarians, and their general von Seckendorff. With most of his lands occupied by the Austrians, Charles VII fled to Augsburg, from where he initiated talks with Vienna and London, feeling he had been abandoned by his French allies. Divided at the top, and their troops weakened by disease, the Franco-Bavarian forces offered limited resistance to the Austrian advance; on 9 May, the Bavarians were defeated outside Simbach, by Charles of Lorraine.

In mid-June, the Pragmatic Army arrived at Aschaffenburg, on the north bank of the River Main. Here they were joined by George II, who was attending the coronation of a new Elector of Mainz in Wiesbaden. By late June, the Allies were running short of supplies and withdrew towards the nearest supply depot at Hanau, the road to which ran through Dettingen, now known as Karlstein am Main, where 23,000 French troops blocked the road. Despite a strong position, mistakes made by their commander Gramont, allowed the Allies to win a narrow victory.

While the Pragmatic Army were able to continue their retreat, they had to abandon their wounded, and although reinforced by Charles of Lorraine were unable to agree what to do next. Charles later described Allied headquarters as a 'republic', while Noailles told Louis XV he was 'heavily indebted to the irresolutions of George II.' They ended by doing nothing, and in October, took up winter quarters in the Netherlands.

Frederick had responded to Dettingen by renewing his search for allies, and building up his army once again. In July, the Russian court discovered an alleged plot to overthrow Tsarina Elizabeth, and restore three-year old Ivan VI, with his mother Grand Duchess Leopoldovna as his regent. Whether this amounted to anything more than drunken gossip is disputed; one suggestion is that it was a fabrication by Frederick, designed to remove anti-Prussian opponents, chiefly Chancellor Bestuzhev-Ryumin.

Anna Bestuzhev, wife of his brother Mikhail, and her friend Natalia Lopukhina, confessed to the plot after 25 days of torture; they were publicly flogged, and had their tongues removed before being exiled to Siberia. Fredrick's supporters referred to it as the "Botta Conspiracy", alleging the involvement of Austrian envoy Antoniotto Botta Adorno. When Tsarina Elizabeth demanded Botta be punished, Maria Theresa refused, and the episode poisoned the relationship between Austria and Russia. Frederick managed to divide his two main opponents, but Bestuzhev-Ryumin remained in place, leaving the overall position unchanged.

On 13 September, Charles Emmanuel III of Sardinia, Maria Theresa and Britain agreed the Treaty of Worms, intended to expel Spain from Italy. In return for Sardinian support in Lombardy, the Austrians ceded all their territories west of the Ticino River and Lake Maggiore, along with lands south of the Po River. In return, Charles Emmanuel renounced his claim to the strategic Duchy of Milan, guaranteed the Pragmatic Sanction, and provided 40,000 troops, paid for by Britain.

France and Spain responded with the Second Pacte de Famille in October, and Louis XV began plans to invade the Austrian Netherlands. The year ended with Saxony agreeing a pact of mutual defence with Austria, leaving Prussia isolated, and facing a renewed offensive as Maria Theresa sought to regain Silesia.

Campaign of 1744

Under the 1743 Treaty of Fontainebleau, Louis XV and his uncle, Philip V of Spain agreed on joint action against Britain. This included a proposed invasion of Britain, aimed at restoring the exiled Stuarts, and over the winter, 12,000 French troops and transports were assembled at Dunkirk.

In the February 1744 Battle of Toulon, a combined Franco-Spanish fleet fought an indecisive action with a British naval force commanded by Admiral Mathews. Although Mathews prevented them exiting the Mediterranean and supporting the invasion attempt, he was forced to retreat, which led to his dismissal. Success allowed Spain to land troops in Northern Italy, and in April they captured the important port of Villefranche-sur-Mer, then part of Savoy.

However, storms sank or severely damaged many French ships, while most of Louis' ministers opposed what they considered an expensive and futile diversion of resources. The invasion was cancelled on 11 March, Louis formally declared war on Britain, and in May, a French army invaded the Austrian Netherlands. As in 1744, they were greatly helped by divisions between the Pragmatic Allies, making it very difficult to formulate a consistent strategy. The British and Hanoverians detested each other, Austrian resources were focused in Alsace, while the Dutch were reluctant to declare war on France, and unsuccessfully tried to persuade Louis to withdraw. The Dutch however did want to protect their Barrier fortresses and Isaac Cronström thus argued to engage the French in the open field. George Wade, supreme commander of the allied army, disagreed. He was under strict orders of the British government to not risk losing his connection to Ostend and not to risk British or Hanoverians troops becoming prisoners of war, which also ment that he refused to put them on garrison duty. The British feared another Jacobite uprising and therefore wanted to be able to send their troops home in time.

As a result, the French made rapid progress, quickly capturing most of the Dutch-held Barrier fortresses along the border, including Menen and Ypres. When an Austrian army under Prince Charles of Lorraine invaded Alsace in early June, Louis went on the defensive in the Southern Netherlands, and travelled to Metz to meet this threat. In early August, he fell dangerously ill with smallpox, a disease often fatal at the time; although he later recovered, this temporarily paralysed the French command system.

With the bulk of the Austrian army occupied in Eastern France, Frederick launched the Second Silesian War on 15 August, and by the end of the month, all 80,000 of his troops were in Bohemia. Although Maria Theresa's main objective was to regain Silesia, the speed of the Prussian advance took them by surprise. On 23 August, Prince Charles withdrew from Alsace to defend Bohemia, with little interference from the French due to Louis' illness.
 

By mid-September, Frederick had captured Prague, Tabor, Budweis and Frauenberg; he now advanced up the Vltava river, hoping to catch the Austrians between his forces, and the Franco-Bavarian army he assumed was in pursuit. However, the Bavarians contented themselves with re-occupying Munich, while the French settled down to besiege Freiburg im Breisgau, a town of far less importance to Maria Theresa than Bohemia.

Frederick was left dangerously exposed, a situation worsened in early October when Saxony joined the coalition against him as an active belligerent. Under pressure from Charles of Lorraine and a combined Austro-Saxon force under Count Traun, the Prussians were forced to retreat; by the time they entered Silesia in late November, Frederick's army was reduced to 36,000, half of whom then died of dysentery.

Despite the surrender of Freiburg and French advances in the Southern Netherlands, Austria seemed well-positioned at the end of 1744. Frederick's retreat damaged his reputation and weakened his army, but the most significant impact was on Franco-Prussian relations, with Louis accused of failing to support Prussia.

In Italy, an Austrian attack on the Kingdom of Naples was unsuccessful, largely due to the incompetence of their commanders. In the north, arguments over strategy, and Spanish accusations of French cowardice at Toulon prevented them from taking full advantage of their victories earlier in the year. This was offset by similar divisions among their opponents; Charles Emmanuel was reluctant to see the Bourbons expelled from Italy, leaving the Habsburgs as the dominant power, while his territorial ambitions could only be achieved at Austrian expense. As a result, neither side could make significant progress in this area.

Campaign of 1745

Frederick's position continued to deteriorate; on 8 January, Austria, Britain, the Dutch Republic and Saxony signed the Treaty of Warsaw, which was clearly aimed at Prussia. This was accompanied by ominous signs of Russian military activity in Livonia, followed by the death of Emperor Charles VII on 20 January. Since Maria Theresa's husband, Duke Francis, was the best-supported candidate to replace him, this was a major setback for the Franco-Prussian alliance.

Charles' son and heir, Max Joseph made one last effort to drive the Austrians out of Bavaria, but his demoralised and ill-equipped army was out-manoeuvered by Count Batthyány, while a Franco-Bavarian army was defeated at Pfaffenhofen on 15 April. With most of his electorate once again occupied, on 22 April he signed the Treaty of Füssen, in which he agreed to vote for Francis Stephen as Emperor, and made peace with Austria. Prussia was now isolated; attempts by Frederick to divide his opponents by supporting Frederick Augustus of Saxony for Emperor were unsuccessful, while neither Britain or Russia was willing to mediate for him with Austria.

Bavaria's exit allowed France to focus on the Low Countries, which Saxe persuaded Louis XV provided the best opportunity of defeating Britain, whose financial backing was crucial to the Pragmatic Alliance. He proposed to attack Tournai, a vital link in the trading network for Northern Europe, and strongest of the Dutch Barrier Forts, this forcing the Allies to fight on ground of his own choosing. On 11 May, he won a hard-fought victory at Fontenoy, a success that established French dominance in the Netherlands, and caused bitter disputes between the British and Dutch.

On 4 June, Frederick won a major victory at Hohenfriedberg, but despite this, Austria and Saxony continued the war. Prussian requests for French support were ignored; Louis had been warned by his ministers state finances were increasingly strained, making it important to focus their efforts. One area was the Netherlands, particularly after British troops were recalled to deal with the 1745 Jacobite Rising. The other was Italy, where a Franco-Spanish army under Maillebois and Infante Philip defeated the Sardinians at Bassignano on 27 September, then captured Alessandria, Valenza and Casale Monferrato. 

As a result, France made no effort to block the election of Duke Francis, who was proclaimed Emperor Francis I on 13 September. Bolstered by this significant political victory, Maria Theresa continued her attempts to regain Silesia, only to be defeated once again at the Battle of Soor on 30 September. On 15 December, the Prussians forced Saxony out of the war with victory in the Battle of Kesselsdorf, leading to the Treaty of Dresden on 25th. Austria accepted Frederick's ownership of Silesia, while Saxony paid him an indemnity of one million crowns; in return, Prussia accepted the Pragmatic Sanction, acknowledged Francis as Emperor, and evacuated Saxony.

After 1745, Germany ceased to be an active military theatre; although Frederick knew Maria Theresa still intended to regain Silesia, both sides needed a period of peace in order to re-organise. French objectives were less clear; for centuries, the central plank of its foreign policy was weakening the Habsburgs, but it began the war due to concern at British commercial growth post-1713. Since the war in Northern Italy was largely fought to support Spanish aims, this left the Netherlands as the only remaining theatre where France could achieve strategic victory.

Another significant development was the start of the realignment of alliances that became the Diplomatic Revolution in 1756. Under the August 'Convention of Hanover', Frederick and George II mutually guaranteed the borders of Hanover and Prussia to each other, and British diplomats tried to persuade Austria to end the Second Silesian War. Franco-Prussian relationships were marked by mutual distrust, while Maria Theresa resented British attempts to persuade her to accept the loss of Silesia.

Italian Campaigns, 1741–1747

In central Italy an army of Spaniards and Neapolitans was collected for the purpose of conquering the Milanese. In 1741, the allied army of 40,000 Spaniards and Neapolitans under the command of the Duke of Montemar had advanced towards Modena, the Duke of Modena had allied himself with them, but the vigilant Austrian commander, Count Otto Ferdinand von Traun had out-marched them, captured Modena and forced the Duke to make a separate peace.

The aggressiveness of the Spanish in Italy forced Empress Maria Theresa of Austria and King Charles Emmanuel of Sardinia into negotiations in early 1742. These negotiations were held at Turin. Maria Theresa sent her envoy Count Schulenburg and King Charles Emmanuel sent the Marquis d'Ormea. On 1 February 1742, Schulenburg and Ormea signed the Convention of Turin which resolved (or postponed resolution) many differences and formed an alliance between the two countries. In 1742, field marshal Count Traun held his own with ease against the Spanish and Neapolitans. On 19 August 1742, Naples was forced by the arrival of a British naval squadron in Naples' own harbour, to withdraw her 10,000 troops from the Montemar force to provide for home defence. The Spanish force under Montemar was now too weak to advance in the Po Valley and a second Spanish army was sent to Italy via France. Sardinia had allied herself with Austria in the Convention of Turin and at the same time neither state was at war with France and this led to curious complications, combats being fought in the Isère valley between the troops of Sardinia and of Spain, in which the French took no part. At the end of 1742, the Duke of Montemar was replaced as head of the Spanish forces in Italy by Count Gages.

In 1743, the Spanish on the Panaro had achieved a victory over Traun at Campo Santo on 8 February 1743. However, the next six months were wasted in inaction and Georg Christian, Fürst von Lobkowitz, joining Traun with reinforcements from Germany, drove back the Spanish to Rimini. Observing from Venice, Rousseau hailed the Spanish retreat as "the finest military manoeuvre of the whole century". The Spanish-Savoyan War in the Alps continued without much result, the only incident of note being the first Battle of Casteldelfino (7–10 October 1743), when an initial French offensive was beaten off.

In 1744 the Italian war became serious. Prior to the War of the Spanish Succession (1701–1714) Spain and Austria had been ruled by the same (Habsburg) royal house. Consequently, the foreign policies of Austria and Spain in regards to Italy had a symmetry of interests and these interests were usually opposed to the interests of Bourbon controlled France. However, since the Treaty of Utrecht and the end of the War of the Spanish Succession, the childless last Habsburg monarch (Charles II) had been replaced by the Bourbon grandson of the French king Louis XIV Philip of Anjou, who became Philip V in Spain. Now the symmetry of foreign policy interests in regards to Italy existed between Bourbon France and Bourbon Spain with Habsburg Austria usually in opposition. King Charles Emmanuel of Savoy had followed the long-established foreign policy of Savoy of opposing Spanish interference in northern Italy. Now in 1744, Savoy was faced with a grandiose military plan of the combined Spanish and French armies (called the Gallispan army) for conquest of northern Italy.

However, in implementing this plan, the Gallispan generals at the front were hampered by the orders of their respective governments. For example, the commander of the Spanish army in the field, the Prince of Conti, could not get along with, or even reason with, the Marquis de La Mina, the Supreme commander of all Spanish forces. The Prince of Conti felt that the Marquis "deferred blindly to all orders coming from Spain" without any consideration of the realities on the ground. In preparation for the military campaign the Gallispan forces sought to cross the Alps in June 1744 and regroup the army in Dauphiné uniting there with the army on the lower Po.

The support of Genoa allowed a road into central Italy. While the Prince of Conti stayed in the north, Count Gages followed this road to the south. But then the Austrian commander, Prince Lobkowitz took the offensive and drove the Spanish army of the Count de Gages further southward towards the Neapolitan frontier near the small town of Velletri. Velletri just happened to be the birthplace of Caesar Augustus, but now from June through August 1744, Velletri became the scene of extensive military maneuvering between the French-Spanish army under the command of the Count Gages and the Austrian forces under the command of Prince Lobkowitz The King of Naples (the future Charles III of Spain) was increasingly worried about the Austrian army operating so close to his borders and decided to assist the Spaniards. Together a combined army of French, Spanish and Neapolitans surprised the Austrian army on the night of 16–17 June 1744. The Austrians were routed from three important hills around the town of Velletri during the attack. This battle is sometimes called the "Battle of Nemi" after the small town of Nemi located nearby. Because of this surprise attack, the combined army was able to take possession of the town of Velletri. Thus, the surprise attack has also been called the "first Battle of Velletri".

In early August 1744, the King of Naples paid a visit in person to the newly captured town of Velletri. Hearing about the presence of the King, the Austrians developed a plan for a daring raid on Velletri. During the predawn hours of 11 August 1744, about 6,000 Austrians under the direct command of Count Browne staged a surprise raid on the town of Velletri. They were attempting to abduct the King of Naples during his stay in the town. However, after occupying Velletri and searching the entire town, the Austrians found no hint of the King of Naples. The King had become aware of what was happening and had fled through a window of the palace where he was staying and rode off half-dressed on horseback out of the town. This was the second Battle of Velletri. The failure of the raid on Velletri meant that the Austrian march toward Naples was over. The defeated Austrians were ordered north where they could be used in the Piedmont of northern Italy to assist the King of Sardinia against the Prince of Conti. Count de Gages followed the Austrians north with a weak force. Meanwhile, the King of Naples returned home.

The war in the Alps and the Apennines had already been keenly contested before the Prince of Conti and the Gallispan army had come down out of the Alps. Villefranche and Montalbán  had been stormed by Conti on 20 April 1744. After coming down out of the Alps, Prince Conti began his advance into Piedmont on 5 July 1744. On 19 July 1744, the Gallispan army engaged the Sardinian army in some desperate fighting at Peyre-Longue on 18 July 1744. As a result of the battle, the Gallispan army took control of Casteldelfino in the second Battle of Casteldelfino. Conti then moved on to Demonte where on the night of 8–9 August 1744, (a mere 36 hours before the Spanish army in south of Italy fought the second Battle of Velletri, [as noted above]) the Gallispan army took the fortress of Demonte from the Sardinians in the Battle of Demonte. The King of Sardinia was defeated yet again by Conti in a great Battle at Madonna dell'Olmo on 30 September 1744 near Coni (Cuneo). Conti did not, however, succeed in taking the huge fortress at Coni and had to retire into Dauphiné for his winter quarters. Thus, the Gallispan army never did combine with the Spanish army under Count of Gages in the south and now the Austro-Sardinian army lay between them.

The campaign in Italy in 1745 was also no mere war of posts. The Convention of Turin of February 1742 (described above), which established a provisional relationship between Austria and Sardinia had caused some consternation in the Republic of Genoa. However, when this provisional relationship was given a more durable and reliable character in the signing of the Treaty of Worms (1743) signed on 13 September 1743, the government of Genoa became fearful. This fear of diplomatic isolation had caused the Genoese Republic to abandon its neutrality in the war and join the Bourbon cause. Consequently, the Genoese Republic signed a secret treaty with the Bourbon allies of France, Spain and Naples. On 26 June 1745, Genoa declared war on Sardinia.

Empress Maria Theresa was frustrated with the failure of Lobkowitz to stop the advance of Gage. Accordingly, Lobkowitz was replaced with Count Schulenburg. A change in the command of the Austrians, encouraged the Bourbon allies to strike first in the spring of 1745. Accordingly, Count de Gages moved from Modena towards Lucca, the Gallispan army in the Alps under the new command of Marshal Maillebois (Prince Conti and Marshal Maillebois had exchanged commands over the winter of 1744–1745) advanced through the Italian Riviera to the Tanaro. In the middle of July 1745, the two armies were at last concentrated between the Scrivia and the Tanaro. Together Count de Gage's army and the Gallispan army composed an unusually large number of 80,000 men. A swift march on Piacenza drew the Austrian commander thither and in his absence the allies fell upon and completely defeated the Sardinians at Bassignano on 27 September 1745, a victory which was quickly followed by the capture of Alessandria, Valenza and Casale Monferrato. Jomini calls the concentration of forces which effected the victory "".

The complicated politics of Italy, however, are reflected in the fact that Count Maillebois was ultimately unable to turn his victory to account. Indeed, early in 1746, Austrian troops, freed by the Austrian peace with Frederick II of Prussia, passed through the Tyrol into Italy. The Gallispan winter quarters at Asti, Italy, were brusquely attacked and a French garrison of 6,000 men at Asti was forced to capitulate. At the same time, Maximilian Ulysses Count Browne with an Austrian corps struck at the allies on the Lower Po, and cut off their communication with the main body of the Gallispan army in Piedmont. A series of minor actions thus completely destroyed the great concentration of Gallispan troops and the Austrians reconquered the duchy of Milan and took possession of much of northern Italy. The allies separated, Maillebois covering Liguria, the Spaniards marching against Browne. The latter was promptly and heavily reinforced and all that the Spaniards could do was to entrench themselves at Piacenza, Philip, the Spanish Infante as supreme commander calling up Maillebois to his aid. The French, skilfully conducted and marching rapidly, joined forces once more, but their situation was critical, for only two marches behind them the army of the King of Sardinia was in pursuit, and before them lay the principal army of the Austrians. The pitched Battle of Piacenza on 16 June 1746 was hard-fought but ended in an Austrian victory, with the Spanish army heavily mauled. That the army escaped at all was in the highest degree creditable to Maillebois and to his son and chief of staff. Under their leadership the Gallispan army eluded both the Austrians and the Sardinians and defeated an Austrian corps in the Battle of Rottofreddo on 12 August 1746. Then the Austrian army made good its retreat back to Genoa.

Although the Austrian army was a mere shadow of its former self, when they returned to Genoa, the Austrians were soon in control of northern Italy. The Austrians occupied the Republic of Genoa on 6 September 1746. But they met with no success in their forays towards the Alps. Soon Genoa revolted from the oppressive rule of the victors, rose and drove out the Austrians on 5–11 December 1746. As an Allied invasion of Provence stalled, and the French, now commanded by Charles Louis Auguste Fouquet, duc de Belle-Isle, took the offensive (1747). Genoa held out against a second Austrian siege. As usual the plan of campaign had been referred to Paris and Madrid. A picked corps of the French army under the Chevalier de Belle-Isle (the younger brother of Marshal Belle-Isle) was ordered to storm the fortified pass of Exilles on 10 July 1747. However, the defending army of the Worms allies (Austria and Savoy) handed the French army a crushing defeat at this battle, which became known as the (Colle dell'Assietta). At this battle, the chevalier, and with him much of the elite of the French nobility, were killed on the barricades. Desultory campaigns continued between the Worms allies and the French until the conclusion of peace at Aix-la-Chapelle.

The Low Countries, 1745–1748

The British and their allies withdrew from Fontenoy in good order but Tournai fell to French forces and through a swift advance, Ghent, Oudenarde, Bruges, and Dendermonde soon followed. By the end of July, the French stood on the threshold of Dutch Flanders, the south-western corner of the Dutch Republic. The French-backed Jacobite rising of August, 1745 forced the British to transfer troops from Flanders to deal with it. This prompted the French to seize the strategic ports of Ostend and Nieuwpoort, threatening Britain's links to mainland Europe.

During 1746, the French continued their advance into the Austrian Netherlands, taking Antwerp and then clearing Dutch and Austrian forces from the area between Brussels and the Meuse. After defeating the Jacobite Rebellion at Culloden in April, the British launched a diversionary raid on Lorient in an unsuccessful attempt to divert French forces, while the new Austrian commander, Prince Charles of Lorraine, was defeated by Saxe at the Battle of Rocoux in October.

The Dutch Republic itself was now in danger. In April 1747, the French began reducing the Barrier Fortresses along the border with the Austrian Netherlands and invaded Dutch Flanders, which they swiftly captured. A general anger and panic broke out under the Dutch population, who still remembered the French invasion of 1672, and they demanded that William IV should be appointed stadtholder. The regents of Zeeland and Holland, fearing violence against them, soon appointed William stadtholder. The remaining provinces followed and by 10 May the Second Stadtholderless Period had ended. William was also appointed head of all the Dutch armed forces. The strategic situation, however, failed to change and at Lauffeld on 2 July 1747, Saxe won another victory over a British and Dutch army under the Prince of Waldeck and Cumberland; the French then besieged Maastricht and Bergen op Zoom, which fell in September. Although the Dutch fleet was in the poorest condition it had ever been in, its positioning in the estuaries and rivers of Zeeland and Holland, however, prevented French incursions into those provinces.

The French advance lent greater urgency to ongoing peace talks at the Congress of Breda, which took place to the sound of French artillery firing on Maastricht. Following their 1746 alliance with Austria, an army of  marched from Livonia to the Rhine, but arrived too late to be of use. Maastricht surrendered on 7 May and on 18 October 1748, the war ended with the signing of the Peace of Aix-la-Chapelle.

The Peace of 1748

Negotiations between Britain and France had been taking place at Breda since June 1746; the terms they agreed were then imposed on the other parties at Aix-la-Chapelle. Despite their victories in Flanders, French Finance Minister Machault repeatedly warned of the impending collapse of their financial system. The British naval blockade led to the collapse of French customs receipts and caused severe food shortages, especially among the poor; after Cape Finisterre in October, the French navy could no longer protect their colonies or trade routes.

This was followed in November by a convention between Britain and Russia; in February 1748, a Russian corps of 37,000 arrived in the Rhineland. Although the Dutch city of Maastricht surrendered to French forces in May 1748, ending the war was increasingly urgent. Louis XV therefore agreed to return the Austrian Netherlands, whose acquisition had cost so much. Few of his countrymen understood this decision; combined with the lack of tangible benefits for helping Prussia, it led to the phrase "as stupid as the Peace".

A commission to negotiate competing territorial claims in North America was set up, but made very little progress. Britain regained Madras, in return for restoring Louisbourg, in Nova Scotia, much to the fury of British colonists. Neither of the two main protagonists appeared to have gained much for their investment and both viewed the Treaty as an armistice, not a peace.

In Austria, reactions were mixed; Maria Theresa was determined to regain Silesia and resented British support for Prussia's occupation. On the other hand, the Treaty confirmed her right to the Monarchy, while the Habsburgs had survived a potentially disastrous crisis, regained the Austrian Netherlands without fighting and made only minor concessions in Italy. Administrative and financial reforms made it stronger in 1750 than 1740, while its strategic position was strengthened through installing Habsburgs as rulers of key territories in Northwest Germany, the Rhineland and Northern Italy.

Of the other combatants, Spain retained its predominance in Spanish America and made minor gains in Northern Italy. With French support, Prussia doubled in size with the acquisition of Silesia but twice made peace without informing their ally; Louis XV already disliked Frederick and now viewed him as untrustworthy. In the Dutch Republic the signing of the peace terms, the elevation of the Prince of Orange and the birth of his son caused great joy, but dissatisfaction towards the ruling regime remained. William IV had changed little, did not reckon with his political opponents and, like them, was accused of French sympathies. Many began to think that improvements would not be obtained unless they were violently demanded; and so riots arose. The war confirmed the decline of the Dutch Republic, and the dismantlement of the Barrier fortresses marked the end of its period as a great power; combined with a sense they received little value for the subsidies paid to Maria Theresa, Britain moved to align itself with Prussia, rather than Austria, in order to protect Hanover from French aggression.

These factors led to the realignment known as the 1756 Diplomatic Revolution and the 1756 to 1763 Seven Years' War, which was even grander in scale than its predecessor.

North America

The war was also conducted in North America and India. In North America the conflict was known in the British colonies as King George's War, and did not begin until after formal war declarations of France and Britain reached the colonies in May 1744. The frontiers between New France and the British colonies of New England, New York, and Nova Scotia were the site of frequent small scale raids, primarily by French colonial troops and their Indian allies against British targets, although several attempts were made by British colonists to organise expeditions against New France. The most significant incident was the capture of the French Fortress Louisbourg on Cape Breton Island (Île Royale) by an expedition (29 April16 June 1745) of colonial militia organised by Massachusetts Governor William Shirley, commanded by William Pepperrell of Maine (then part of Massachusetts), and assisted by a Royal Navy fleet. A French expedition to recover Louisbourg in 1746 failed due to bad weather, disease, and the death of its commander. Louisbourg was returned to France in exchange for Madras, generating much anger among the British colonists, who felt they had eliminated a nest of privateers with its capture.

India

The war marked the beginning of a powerful struggle between Britain and France in India and of European military ascendancy and political intervention in the subcontinent. Major hostilities began with the arrival of a naval squadron under Mahé de la Bourdonnais, carrying troops from France. In September 1746 Bourdonnais landed his troops near Madras and laid siege to the port. Although it was the main British settlement in the Carnatic, Madras was weakly fortified and had only a small garrison, reflecting the thoroughly commercial nature of the European presence in India hitherto. On 10 September, only six days after the arrival of the French force, Madras surrendered. The terms of the surrender agreed by Bourdonnais provided for the settlement to be ransomed back for a cash payment by the British East India Company. However, this concession was opposed by Dupleix, the governor general of the Indian possessions of the Compagnie des Indes. When Bourdonnais was forced to leave India in October after the devastation of his squadron by a cyclone Dupleix reneged on the agreement. The Nawab of the Carnatic Anwaruddin Muhammed Khan intervened in support of the British and advanced to retake Madras, but despite vast superiority in numbers his army was easily and bloodily crushed by the French, in the first demonstration of the gap in quality that had opened up between European and Indian armies.

The French now turned to the remaining British settlement in the Carnatic, Fort St. David at Cuddalore, which was dangerously close to the main French settlement of Pondichéry. The first French force sent against Cuddalore was surprised and defeated nearby by the forces of the Nawab and the British garrison in December 1746. Early in 1747 a second expedition laid siege to Fort St David but withdrew on the arrival of a British naval squadron in March. A final attempt in June 1748 avoided the fort and attacked the weakly fortified town of Cuddalore itself, but was routed by the British garrison.

With the arrival of a naval squadron under Admiral Boscawen, carrying troops and artillery, the British went on the offensive, laying siege to Pondichéry. They enjoyed a considerable superiority in numbers over the defenders, but the settlement had been heavily fortified by Dupleix and after two months the siege was abandoned.

The peace settlement brought the return of Madras to the British company, exchanged for Louisbourg in Canada. However, the conflict between the two companies continued by proxy during the interval before the outbreak of the Seven Years' War, with British and French forces fighting on behalf of rival claimants to the thrones of Hyderabad and the Carnatic.

Naval operations

The naval operations of this war were entangled with the War of Jenkins' Ear, which broke out in 1739 in consequence of the long disputes between Britain and Spain over their conflicting claims in America. The war was remarkable for the prominence of privateering on both sides. It was carried on by the Spaniards in the West Indies with great success, and actively at home. The French were no less active in all seas. Mahé de la Bourdonnais's attack on Madras partook largely of the nature of a privateering venture. The British retaliated with vigour. The total number of captures by French and Spanish corsairs was in all probability larger than the list of British—as the French wit Voltaire drolly put it upon hearing his government's boast, namely, that more British merchants were taken because there were many more British merchant ships to take; but partly also because the British government had not yet begun to enforce the use of convoy so strictly as it did in later times.

West Indies

War on Spain was declared by Great Britain on 23 October 1739, which has become known as the War of Jenkins' Ear. A plan was laid for combined operations against the Spanish colonies from east and west. One force, military and naval, was to assault them from the West Indies under Admiral Edward Vernon. Another, to be commanded by Commodore George Anson, afterwards Lord Anson, was to round Cape Horn and to fall upon the Pacific coast of Latin America. Delays, bad preparations, dockyard corruption, and the squabbles of the naval and military officers concerned caused the failure of a hopeful scheme. On 21 November 1739, Admiral Vernon did, however, succeed in capturing the ill-defended Spanish harbour of Porto Bello in present-day Panama. When Vernon had been joined by Sir Chaloner Ogle with massive naval reinforcements and a strong body of troops, an attack was made on Cartagena de Indias in what is now Colombia (9 March24 April 1741). The delay had given the Spanish under Sebastián de Eslava and Blas de Lezo time to prepare. After two months of skilful defence by the Spanish, the British attack finally succumbed to a massive outbreak of disease and withdrew having suffered a dreadful loss of lives and ships.

The war in the West Indies, after two other unsuccessful attacks had been made on Spanish territory, died down and did not revive until 1748. The expedition under Anson sailed late, was very ill-provided, and less strong than had been intended. It consisted of six ships and left Britain on 18 September 1740. Anson returned alone with his flagship the Centurion on 15 June 1744. The other vessels had either failed to round the Horn or had been lost. But Anson had harried the coast of Chile and Peru and had captured a Spanish galleon of immense value near the Philippines. His cruise was a great feat of resolution and endurance.

After the failure of the British invasions and a Spanish counter invasion of Georgia in 1742, belligerent naval actions in the Caribbean were left to the privateers of both sides. Fearing great financial and economic losses should a treasure fleet be captured, the Spanish reduced the risk by increasing the number of convoys, thereby reducing their value. They also increased the number of ports they visited and reduced the predictability of their voyages.

In 1744 a British force of 300 men accompanied by two privateers from Saint Kitts successfully captured the French half of neighbouring Saint Martin, occupying it until the 1748 Treaty of Aix-la-Chapelle. In late May 1745 two French royal frigates of 36 and 30 guns respectively under Commodore La Touché, plus three privateers in retaliation sailed from Martinique to invade and capture the British colony of Anguilla but were repelled with heavy loss.

The last year of the war saw two significant actions in the Caribbean. A second British assault on Santiago de Cuba which also ended in failure and a naval action which arose from an accidental encounter between two convoys. The action unfolded in a confused way with each side at once anxious to cover its own trade and to intercept that of the other. Capture was rendered particularly desirable for the British by the fact that the Spanish homeward-bound fleet would be laden with bullion from the American mines. The advantage lay with the British when one Spanish warship ran aground and another was captured but the British commander failed to capitalise and the Spanish fleet took shelter in Havana.

Mediterranean

While Anson was pursuing his voyage round the world, Spain was mainly intent on the Italian policy of the King. A squadron was fitted out at Cádiz to convey troops to Italy. It was watched by the British admiral Nicholas Haddock. When the blockading squadron was forced off by want of provisions, the Spanish admiral Don Juan José Navarro put to sea. He was followed, but when the British force came in sight of him Navarro had been joined by a French squadron under Claude-Elisée de La Bruyère de Court (December 1741). The French admiral told Haddock that he would support the Spaniards if they were attacked and Haddock retired. France and Great Britain were not yet openly at war, but both were engaged in the struggle in Germany—Great Britain as the ally of the Queen of Hungary, Maria Theresa; France as the supporter of the Bavarian claimant of the empire. Navarro and de Court went on to Toulon, where they remained until February 1744. A British fleet watched them, under the command of Admiral Richard Lestock, until Sir Thomas Mathews was sent out as commander-in-chief and as Minister to the Court of Turin.

Sporadic manifestations of hostility between the French and British took place in different seas, but avowed war did not begin until the French government issued its declaration of 30 March, to which Great Britain replied on 31 March. This formality had been preceded by French preparations for the invasion of England, and by the Battle of Toulon between the British and a Franco-Spanish fleet. On 11 February, a most confused battle was fought, in which the van and centre of the British fleet was engaged with the Spanish rear and centre of the allies. Lestock, who was on the worst possible terms with his superior, took no part in the action. Mathews fought with spirit but in a disorderly way, breaking the formation of his fleet, and showing no power of direction, while Navarro's smaller fleet retained cohesion and fought off the energetic but confused attacks of its larger enemy until the arrival of the French fleet forced the heavily damaged British fleet to withdraw. The Spanish fleet then sailed to Italy where it delivered a fresh army and supplies that had a decisive impact upon the war. The mismanagement of the British fleet in the battle, by arousing deep anger among the people, led to a drastic reform of the British navy.

Northern waters
The French scheme to invade Britain was arranged in combination with the Jacobite leaders, and soldiers were to be transported from Dunkirk. In February 1744, a French fleet of twenty sail of the line entered the English Channel under Jacques Aymar, comte de Roquefeuil, before the British force under Admiral John Norris was ready to oppose him. But the French force was ill-equipped, the admiral was nervous, his mind dwelt on all the misfortunes which might possibly happen, and the weather was bad. De Roquefeuil came up almost as far as The Downs, where he learnt that Sir John Norris was at hand with twenty-five sail of the line, and thereupon precipitately retreated. The military expedition prepared at Dunkirk to cross under cover of De Roquefeuil's fleet naturally did not start. The utter weakness of the French at sea, due to long neglect of the fleet and the bankrupt state of the treasury, was shown during the Jacobite rising of 1745, when France made no attempt to profit by the distress of the British government.

The Dutch, having by this time joined Great Britain, made a serious addition to the naval power opposed to France, though the Dutch Republic was compelled by the necessity for maintaining an army in Flanders to play a very subordinate part at sea. Not being stimulated by formidable attack, and having immediate interests both at home and in Germany, the British government was slow to make use of its latest naval strength. Spain, which could do nothing of an offensive character, was almost neglected. During 1745 the New England expedition which took Louisburg (30 April16 June) was covered by a British naval force, but little else was accomplished by the naval efforts of any of the belligerents.

In 1746 a British combined naval and military expedition to the coast of France—the first of a long series of similar ventures which in the end were derided as "breaking windows with guineas"—was carried out during August and October. The aim was the capture of the French East India Company's dockyard at Lorient, but it was not attained.

From 1747 until the close of the war in October 1748, the naval policy of the British government, without reaching a high level, was more energetic and coherent. A closer watch was kept on the French coast, and effectual means were taken to intercept communication between France and her American possessions. In the spring information was obtained that an important convoy for the East and West Indies was to sail from L'Orient. The convoy was intercepted by Anson on 3 May, and in the first Battle of Cape Finisterre, British admiral George Anson's fourteen ships of the line wiped out the French escort of six ships of the line and three armed Indiamen, although in the meantime the merchant ships escaped.

On 14 October, another French convoy, protected by a strong squadron, was intercepted by a well-appointed and well-directed squadron of superior numbers—the squadrons were respectively eight French and fourteen British—in the Bay of Biscay. In the second Battle of Cape Finisterre which followed, the French admiral, Henri-François des Herbiers-l'Étenduère, succeeded in covering the escape of most of the merchant ships, but Hawke's British squadron took six of his warships. Most of the merchantmen were later intercepted and captured in the West Indies. This disaster convinced the French government of its helplessness at sea, and it made no further effort.

Indian Ocean

In the East Indies, attacks on French commerce by a British squadron under Curtis Barnett in 1745 led to the despatch of a French squadron commanded by Mahé de la Bourdonnais. After an inconclusive clash off Negapatnam in July 1746, Edward Peyton, Barnett's successor, withdrew to Bengal, leaving Bourdonnais unopposed on the Coromandel Coast. He landed troops near Madras and besieged the port by land and sea, forcing it to surrender on 10 September 1746. In October the French squadron was devastated by a cyclone, losing four ships of the line and suffering heavy damage to four more, and the surviving ships withdrew. French land forces went on to make several attacks on the British settlement at Cuddalore, but the eventual replacement of the negligent Peyton by Thomas Griffin resulted in a return to British naval supremacy which put the French on the defensive. Despite the appearance of another French squadron, the arrival of large-scale British reinforcements under Edward Boscawen (who considered but did not make an attack on Île de France on the way) gave the British overwhelming dominance on land and sea, but the ensuing siege of Pondichéry organised by Boscawen was unsuccessful.

Strength of armies, 1740

Related wars
 First Silesian War (1740–1742) – Prussian invasion and ensuing Central European theatre of the war
 Second Silesian War (1744–1745) – Renewed Prussian invasion and continuation of First Silesian War
 First Carnatic War – Anglo-French rivalry in India often seen as a theatre of the War of the Austrian Succession.
 Russo-Swedish War (1741–1743) – Swedish and Russian participation in the War of the Austrian Succession.
 King George's War – American participation in the War of the Austrian Succession.
 War of Jenkins' Ear – Anglo-Spanish war which merged into the War of the Austrian Succession.
 Jacobite rising of 1745 – France provided limited support to Charles Edward Stuart's invasion of Great Britain.

Gallery

References

Sources
 
 
 
 
 
 
 
 
 
 
 
 
 
 
 
 
 
 
 
 
 
 
 
 
 
 
 
 
 
 
 
 
 
 
 
 
 
 
 
 
 
 
 
 
 
 
 
  online pp. 416–439
 
 
 
 
 
 

 
1740s conflicts
1740s in the Habsburg monarchy
18th-century conflicts
Global conflicts
Rebellions against the Habsburg monarchy
Wars involving the Dutch Republic
Wars involving the Habsburg monarchy
Wars of succession involving the states and peoples of Europe
1740s in India
Maria Theresa